Buchanania is a genus of sea snails, marine gastropod mollusks in the family Fissurellidae, the keyhole limpets and slit limpets.

Species
Species within the genus Buchanania (gastropod) include:
Buchanania onchidioides Lesson, 1831

References

External links
 To GenBank 
 To World Register of Marine Species

Fissurellidae
Monotypic gastropod genera
Taxa named by René Lesson